Betül Mardin (born 1 December 1926) is a Turkish journalist who laid the foundations of public relations in Turkey.

Early life and education 
Mardin was born on 1926 in Istanbul. She is the second child of the Mardin family, an Ottoman family whose roots go back to Hussein, the grandson of Muhammad, the prophet of Islam. She is the older sister of famous music producer Arif Mardin.

She graduated from Arnavutköy American College for Girls and BBC Television Course, rose to the presidency of the International Public Relations Association (IPRA) in 1995 and became the first Turkish female president of IPRA with this task. She is considered a master in public relations with this award, which is one of the few in the world, with the title "Member Emeritus", which was later given to her by the International Public Relations Association. She is a faculty member at Istanbul Bilgi University, Faculty of Communication, Department of Public Relations.

Personal life 
Betül was married twice, first with Akgün Usta where she had a daughter and second with Turkish actor Haldun Dormen where she had a son.

References 

1926 births
Living people
Turkish journalists
People from Istanbul
Istanbul Bilgi University alumni
Istanbul Bilgi University people